The Woonasquatucket River (pronounced , Algonquian for "where the salt water ends") is a river in the U.S. state of Rhode Island.

Together with the Blackstone River to the north, the Woonasquatucket was designated an American Heritage River in 1998.  Both rivers played active roles in the industrial revolution and the history of Rhode Island in the 19th century. Evidence of this industrial history remains in the fact that there are 18 dams along the river's length.

Course
The river begins in the swamps west of Primrose Pond in North Smithfield and runs southeast past Primrose Pond to Stillwater Reservoir.  Below the reservoir, the river continues southeast, providing water to numerous ponds, until going under Providence Place mall and joining the Moshassuck River in front of the One Citizens Plaza building in downtown Providence to form the Providence River.  The lower part of the river, below Rising Sun Dam in Olneyville is tidal.

250 years ago, the river flowed into what was called "The Great Salt Cove," just a little below where Rising Sun Dam now stands. The Great Salt Cove was about 1 1/2 miles long and up to half a mile wide, covering several hundred acres. Much of the present, flat land in this area was once either the cove itself or salt marshes along the edges of the cove. The flat land is fill added over the years to make more land to build on, beginning as early as 1780. The western end of the Great Salt Cove was near where Atwells Avenue now crosses Route 6. 

From near the Atwells Avenue bridge over the Woonasquatucket to Interstate 95 and on to it's present mouth, the Woonasquatucket's course is a man-made channel that flows underneath Providence Place Mall and through Waterplace Park.  In Waterplace Park, the Woonasquatucket River is also used as part of Waterfire.

Crossings
Below is a list of all 29 crossings over the Woonasquatucket River. The list starts at the headwaters and goes downstream.
North Smithfield
Greenville Road (RI 5/104)
Douglas Pike (RI 7)
Smithfield
Farnum Pike (RI 5/104)
Old Forge Road
Farnum Pike (RI 5/104)
George Washington Highway (RI 116)
Capron Road
Whipple Avenue
Farnum Pike (RI 104)
Esmond Street
Esmond Mill Drive
North Providence
Angell Avenue
Putnam Pike (U.S. 44)
Allendale Avenue
Johnston
Greenville Avenue (Greenville Avenue becomes Manton Avenue as it crosses the river)
Providence
Glenbridge Avenue
U.S. 6 (Twice)
Manton Avenue
Delaine Street
Valley Street
Atwells Avenue
Eagle Street
Acorn Street
Dean Street
Bath Street
Interstate 95
Francis Street
Exchange Street
Steeple Street (U.S. 44 Eastbound)

History

The river was an important transportation route for native peoples, especially for connecting various tribes of the Algonquian nation to what is now the Providence River and the Atlantic Ocean beyond.  The area now known as Federal Hill in Providence was an important meeting place along the river for bands of the Narragansett and Wampanoag tribes.  Known as Nocabulabet (pronounced "nok-a-BUL-a-bet"; thought to be an early settlers version of an Algonquian phrase meaning "hill above the river" or "place between the ancient waters"), this was a place where tribes gathered for trading and harvest festivals.  Some believe it was also used as a vantage point to watch for marauding tribes approaching from Narragansett Bay.

Tributaries
In addition to many unnamed tributaries, the following brooks and rivers feed the Woonasquatucket:
Latham Brook
Stillwater River
Harris Brook
Hawkins Brook
Assapumpset Brook
Reaper Brook
Mattetee Swamp Brook
Hanton Brook
Gould Brook
Whipple Brook
Pleasant Valley Stream

Notes

See also
List of rivers in Rhode Island
Moshassuck River
Providence River
Stillwater River

References
Maps from the United States Geological Survey

External links
Blackstone and Woonasquatucket Rivers at American Heritage Rivers

American Heritage Rivers
Rivers of Providence County, Rhode Island
Geography of Providence, Rhode Island
Rivers of Rhode Island
Tributaries of Providence River